John Francis Welsh (1856–1916) was Bishop of Trinidad and Tobago from 1904 until his death in 1916.

He was born in Huddersfield in 1856 and educated at Christ Church, Oxford. After graduation, he was ordained in 1882 and began his ecclesiastical career with a curacy at St James, Whitehaven. From 1883  until 1886 he was a Lecturer at St Bees’ Theological College and from then (until his appointment to the episcopate) Principal of Warminster Missionary College. He became a Doctor of Divinity (DD).

References

1856 births
1916 deaths
Alumni of Christ Church, Oxford
People from Huddersfield
Anglican bishops of Trinidad and Tobago
Clergy from Yorkshire